Johnny Patterson (died July 5, 1969) was a NASCAR Grand National Series driver from Huntington, West Virginia.

Summary
He drove from 1952 to 1959 and scored four "top five" finishes and six "top ten" finishes. Patterson completed 3,255 laps while earning $6,303 in his career. Despite his best efforts, Patterson started an average of 22nd while finishing an average of 21st place over six years.

Patterson would improve on his 25th place start at the 1954 Southern 500 to finish in a respectable 14th place; taking home $225 in winnings. At the 1955 Southern 500, Johnny Patterson qualified in 46th place in his 1955 Mercury vehicle only to finish the race in 22nd place out of 69 drivers; collecting $225 after a long day's work. The following year at the 1956 Southern 500, Patterson would qualify in 25th place and would end up finishing in 14th place out of 70 drivers; collecting another $225 for his hard work.

Short tracks were Patterson's specialty, as he would finish an average of 18th place. His troubles came mostly at road courses where a 50th-place finish was par for the course. Patterson liked Piedmont Interstate Fairgrounds where he would finish in 5th place but would strongly dislike Daytona Beach and Road Course, where he would finish in a dishonorable 50th place.

Patterson was mostly associated with the #55 Chevrolet owned by Bernard Friedland. He would also drive for the Hudson, Oldsmobile and Mercury brands.

References

1969 deaths
NASCAR drivers
People from West Virginia